Oblivion Access is the second studio album by rapper Lil Ugly Mane. It was self-released via Bandcamp on December 18, 2015, with a vinyl release by Ormolycka Records. Released with the intent to be the final Lil Ugly Mane studio album, it stood as such until the release of Volcanic Bird Enemy and the Voiced Concern (2021).

Track listing

References 

2015 albums
Travis Miller (musician) albums